Callia fulvocincta is a species of beetle in the family Cerambycidae. It was described by Bates in 1866. It is known from Mexico, Guatemala, Nicaragua, Ecuador, Honduras, Panama, Peru, and Brazil.

References

Calliini
Beetles described in 1866